William Steven Joachim (born March 27, 1952) was an American football player.  He won the Maxwell Award in 1974 and played professionally in the National Football League (NFL) with the New York Jets.  He grew up in Havertown, Pennsylvania and played high school football at Haverford High School. He entered the world of Pennsylvania politics in 1982; losing his race for the U.S. House of Representatives.

See also
 List of NCAA major college football yearly passing leaders
 List of NCAA major college football yearly total offense leaders

References

1952 births
Living people
American football quarterbacks
New York Jets players
Penn State Nittany Lions football players
Temple Owls football players
Maxwell Award winners
People from Haverford Township, Pennsylvania
People from Newtown Township, Delaware County, Pennsylvania
Players of American football from Pennsylvania